Joshua Stephen Chetwynd (born September 11, 1971) is a British-born American journalist, broadcaster, author, sports agent and former baseball player. He has also competed in the sport of curling.

Journalism
Chetwynd has worked as a staff reporter for USA Today, The Hollywood Reporter and U.S. News & World Report. His writing has also appeared in such publications/websites as The Wall Street Journal, The Times (of London), Chicago Tribune,  MLB.com, Harvard Negotiation Law Review, The Observer Sport Monthly, and Variety.
He was a two-time winner of the Los Angeles Press Club Award for best newspaper article written by a correspondent (1999 and 2000). In 2022, Chetwynd received a SABR Baseball Research Award for an article he wrote in Nine: A Journal of Baseball History and Cuture.

Broadcasting
Between 2002 and 2008, Chetwynd served as a baseball analyst for the British television network Five, primarily alongside presenter Jonny Gould on MLB on Five. He joined the show at the beginning of the 2002 season and worked as the co-host until the middle of the 2003 campaign when he returned to the United States. While in the U.S. he did on-camera interviews and reports for the show at both the World Series (2003–2005) and Spring Training in Arizona (2004–2005). At the start of the 2006 season, he resumed the co-host position full-time and held that post until the show was cancelled after the 2008 season. In October 2006, Chetwynd also took over hosting duties on Five's Monday night coverage of the NFL for a season, replacing Colin Murray. In addition, Chetwynd did voice over work for sports packages on Five's sister digital station Five US between 2006 and 2008.

On 4 July 2010, he began co-hosting MLB on 5 Live with Jonny Gould on BBC Radio 5 Live Sports Extra. In 2011, the show was picked up for second season with Nat Coombs replacing Gould as Chetwynd's regular co-host. Third and fourth seasons featured Coombs and Chetwynd in 2012 and 2013. During the 2013 post season, Chetwynd served as the program's primary host, anchoring the BBC's World Series studio show with former Major League pitcher Jason Hirsh filling the analyst's role.

As part of the coverage, Chetwynd has also done live color-commentary, on-site at the World Series with Simon Brotherton providing play-by-play in 2011 and 2012. Chetwynd previously collaborated with Brotherton in the same role for the BBC between 2003 and 2005. In 2012, the pair also broadcast MLB's Opening Series between the Oakland A's and Seattle Mariners in Tokyo, Japan. In September of that year, Chetwynd was the on-air analyst for television broadcasts of the World Baseball Classic - Qualifier 2 in Regensberg, Germany. Telecasts aired on the MLB Network and MLB.com in the U.S., Sportsnet in Canada and ESPN America in Europe.  In 2019, Chetwynd provided commentary on BT Sport's coverage of the 2019 MLB London Series.

Books
Chetwynd has written a number of books.

A second edition to his Baseball in Europe: A Country by Country History (2nd ed.) came out in October 2019. More than a decade after the original was written, this volume features approximately 80 new interviews and 70 new photos and images, updating the histories of baseball in more than 40 European countries. The Midwest Book Review said about the second edition: "A fascinating and informative sports history ... will prove to be a unique and unreservedly recommended addition to personal, professional, community, college, and university library Sports History collections in general, and Baseball History supplemental studies reading lists in particular."

Totally Scripted: Idioms, Words, And Quotes From Hollywood To Broadway That Have Changed The English Language was released in February 2017. The book received positive notices from a number of film and TV professionals. Pat Sajak wrote: "Josh Chetwynd has created a furiously fast, funny, fantastic read." Actor Gary Sinise said: "Totally Scripted by Josh Chetwynd entertains and educates on the origin of words, lines and phrases that have become a part of our everyday lives. For those in and outside of the entertainment business it is a wonderful read." Tony-nominated director Jason Moore added: "Totally Scripted is a wonderful, insightful read, packed with fascinating anecdotes and knowledge that will delight and inform everyone who loves the stage, film and TV."

The Field Guide to Sports Metaphors: A Compendium of Competitive Words and Idioms came out in May 2016. It looks at how sports have changed the English language through words and idioms. The author Bill Bryson endorsed the book saying, it is "fascinating, informative and hugely entertaining. This is a book I will return to again and again." When the volume was released, Mental Floss named it one of "25 Amazing New Books for Spring."

The Book of Nice: A Nice Book About Nice Things For Nice People was released in April 2013. It delves into the origins and history of all things nice from gestures, sayings and songs to icons, offerings and characters. Gayle King in O, The Oprah Magazine said the book was "a smart look at all things ... nice." The Huffington Post wrote: "Chetwynd explores being nice through chapters on gestures, songs, words, characters and offerings that spread the love and does so with wit and intelligence."

How the Hot Dog Found its Bun: Accidental Discoveries and Unexpected Inspiration That Shape What We Eat and Drink came out in May 2012. It examines how luck has shaped so many of our favorite foods and drinks as well as kitchen innovations and inventions. The Louisville Courier-Journal said: "You'll be delighted by the author's splendidly told tales of [these] creations ... These are engrossing essays that are sure to steal a few hours of your time." The Midwest Book Review wrote the book was "a 'must' for any general lending library seeing popularity in either trivia books, cookbooks, or both ... A fun, compelling read for a wide audience spiced with illustrations throughout by David Cole Wheeler, this is simply not to be missed." In May 2015, the book reached number 13 on The New York Times Best Seller List in the ebook/non-fiction category.

The Secret History of Balls: The Stories Behind the Things We Love to Catch, Whack, Throw, Kick, Bounce and Bat was released in May 2011 to very positive reviews. NPR named it one of the "Best Books of 2011," calling Chetwynd "a great storyteller." The Denver Post wrote: "[Chetwynd] shows us how the evolution of the ball has had a profound influence not only on each athletic activity we play but on much larger issues such as technology, language and culture." New York Journal of Books said: "Anyone with an interest in sports or game development and history will thoroughly enjoy bouncing through these offerings." The Wall Street Journal dubbed it "[a] little gem of a book ..." and ESPN The Magazine labelled it "essential trivia."

Chetwynd's 2008 book Baseball in Europe: A Country by Country History received critical acclaim. Booklist called it "an excellent research tool as well as informative and entertaining." MLB.com wrote it was "a comprehensive, handy reference guide to everything you need to know about America's Pastime on the Old Continent." Nine: A Journal for Baseball History and Culture said it was "a well-written, highly informed, carefully researched and scrupulously documented addition to international baseball scholarship."

He also co-wrote the 2007 book British Baseball and the West Ham Club: History of a 1930s Professional Team in East London. It was written with Brian A. Belton.

In addition, he has contributed chapters or essays to four other books: Baseball Beyond Our Borders: An International Pastime, Baseball without Borders: The International Pastime', West Ham United Miscellany' and Nine Aces and a Joker'

Baseball career
Chetwynd's baseball career included stints at the NCAA Division I college level, professional baseball in the United States and Europe and international play for the Great Britain national baseball team.
He competed for four years at Northwestern University in the Big Ten conference. He was named to Academic All Big Ten teams twice as a catcher. Following graduation in 1993, he signed a professional contract with the Zanesville Greys in the independent Frontier League. The team won the first-ever Frontier League championship that year, but Chetwynd was released midway through the season.

Although he grew up in Los Angeles, Chetwynd was born in London, England. Beginning in 1996, he had a 10-year career as a member of the Great Britain national squad. He would represent GB in five European Championships (1996, 1999, 2001, 2003, 2005). His best performances came in 1996 and 2001. At the 1996 European (B-Pool) Championships he hit .412 with a .706 slugging percentage. The team won the gold medal at that event to earn elevation into the top tier of European baseball. At the top level in 2001 he hit .353 at the championships held in Germany.

In 2003, Chetwynd played a season as a professional in Sweden's Elitserien, helping Oskarshamn to a share of the regular season title. He finished his career playing in Great Britain's top league. As a player-coach, he led the London Mets to two national championships (2007, 2008). In 2009, his final season, he won a third championship as a member of the Bracknell Blazers. In the finals that year, he went 5-for-5 with 4 RBI. Overall, he hit .440 over six seasons in Great Britain's highest domestic league.

In 2014, he was inducted into the British Baseball Hall of Fame.

Sports Agent
He negotiated the largest international amateur free agent contract for a European player, a $1.3 million deal with the Kansas City Royals for Italy's Marten Gasparini. Chetwynd also served as an agent for Gift Ngoepe, who became the first-ever African player to reach the Major Leagues.

Curling
Chetwynd began playing the sport of curling recreationally in 2014. In 2016, he transitioned into competitive curling, joining Team Sobering. That year, the rink competed in the USA Men's Challenge Round in the hopes of earning a spot at the U.S. National Championships. After losing their first two games at the competition, the team ran off five straight victories to qualify. In doing so, the rink became the first Colorado-based team to reach the event in two decades. At the 2017 United States Men's Curling Championship, Team Sobering placed ninth. Chetwynd played lead for the team.

In 2017-2018, the team's performance was not as strong. The rink did have one notable victory during that campaign, beating Team Fournier at the Moosehead Fall Open, 7-6. Team Fournier would go on that season to represent Quebec in the 2018 Tim Hortons Brier. The team's results were better in World Curling Tour events over the next two years, finishing in the money at the US Open of Curling Contender in 2019 (quarterfinals) and 2020 (semifinals).

Chetwynd won a silver medal at the USA Curling Club National Championships in 2022.

Education
Chetwynd holds two degrees in journalism from Northwestern: a BSJ (1993) and an MSJ (1994). He graduated with a JD from the University of Arizona in 2006 and completed an LLM from The London School of Economics and Political Science in 2009.

For his work at the LSE, he received the 2009 Brian Keelan Memorial Prize for excellence in the study of dispute resolution in a commercial context.

References

Major League Baseball broadcasters
English baseball players
Great Britain national baseball team players
Great Britain
National Football League announcers
Living people
British television presenters
Northwestern Wildcats baseball players
Medill School of Journalism alumni
James E. Rogers College of Law alumni
Alumni of the London School of Economics
1971 births